Panicos Orphanides (born 27 July 1961) is a Cypriot former football manager and former football player.

He played for AEL Limassol from 1977 to 1993, where he celebrated three Cypriot Cups.

As a manager, Orphanides started as an assistant to Andreas Michaelides in AEL Limassol. He then took AEP Paphos and helped the team to earn promotion to the Cypriot First Division in 2002. He took over at Nea Salalmia. In 2003–04, the team easily won the Cypriot Second Division and returned to the major league. In 2004–05, Nea Salamina reached the sixth place of the League.

Orphanides also managed his former team AEL in the 2006–07 season, and again Nea Salamina. On 28 September 2009 he announced his retirement from his managerial career.

Career
1977-1993 AEL Limassol

Teams managed
2000-2001 AEL Limassol (assistant manager)
2001-2002 AEP Paphos
2003-2005 Nea Salamina
2006-2007 AEL Limassol
2007-2008 Nea Salamina
2009-2010 Ethnikos Achna
 On 28 September 2009 he announced his retirement from his managerial career.

Honours

As a player
Cypriot Cup (1985, 1987, 1989), with AEL Limassol
Cypriot Super Cup (1985), with AEL Limassol

As a manager
Cypriot Second Division winner (2004), with Nea Salamina
Cypriot Second Division third place (2002), with AEP Paphos

References

External links

1961 births
Living people
Cypriot footballers
Cypriot football managers
AEL Limassol players
AEL Limassol managers
Nea Salamis Famagusta FC managers
Ethnikos Achna FC managers
Association footballers not categorized by position
Cyprus international footballers